National Highway 702A, commonly called NH 702A is a national highway in states of Nagaland and Manipur in India. It is a branch of primary National Highway 2.

Route 
NH2 near Mokokchung, Zunheboto, Satakha, Phek, NH29 near Jessam

Junctions  

Terminal with NH 2 near Mokokchung.

Terminal with NH 29 near Jessam.

See also 
List of National Highways in India by highway number

References

External links
 New National Highways notification - Government of India

National highways in India
National Highways in Nagaland
National Highways in Manipur
Mokokchung district